XTP may refer to:
Extreme Transaction Processing, an exceptionally demanding form of transaction processing 
Xanthosine triphosphate, a nucleotide
Ksantyp, a Polish guitarist - bands: moutza, hwt, ntk, enteka, proletaryat, corn. Known as well as Ikstepe, XTP or Ksanio
Xpress Transport Protocol, a transport layer protocol
XML Template Pages, enhances JSP pages with stylesheets
 Xtreme Toolkit Professional, enhanced commercial toolkit for GUI development with MFC by Codejock Software.
Extreme Terminal Performance branded XTP, a self-defense bullet type produced by Hornady Manufacturing Company.
 XrisToPanagies, furious cursing of the divine, usually directed at incompetent people that are profoundly failing on a task.